Serge Romano (born 25 May 1964 in Metz) is a French retired professional football defender and coach who was most recently assistant manager of Nottingham Forest

Coaching career
He became Amiens SC manager in June 2009. and on 15 October 2009 Amiens have communicated to have fired their coach, that will be temporarily replaced by Fabien Mercadal.

References

External links
Profile on FC Metz official site

1964 births
Living people
French people of Italian descent
Footballers from Metz
French footballers
Association football defenders
FC Metz players
Toulouse FC players
FC Martigues players
Wolverhampton Wanderers F.C. players
ES Troyes AC players
Ligue 1 players
Ligue 2 players
English Football League players
French expatriate footballers
French expatriate sportspeople in England
Expatriate footballers in England
French football managers
ES Troyes AC managers
CS Sedan Ardennes managers
Dijon FCO managers
Amiens SC managers
Nottingham Forest F.C. non-playing staff
Ligue 1 managers
Ligue 2 managers
French expatriate sportspeople in China
French expatriate sportspeople in Qatar
French expatriate sportspeople in Algeria